Dana Rose DeLorenzo (born January 1, 1983) is an American actress and former radio personality and producer. She is best known for her starring role as Kelly Maxwell in the Starz horror-comedy series Ash vs Evil Dead (2015–2018).

Career

DeLorenzo began acting as a child in radio commercials for a clothing store owned by her father. Her first paid acting job was performing in a weekly cabaret-style dinner show at 11 years old. She was also a cast member and dance captain in Tony n' Tina's Wedding in Chicago. DeLorenzo worked as a producer and portrayed Marissa Sanchez on the nationally syndicated radio show Mancow's Morning Madhouse for a number of years. She was a regular on The Late Late Show with Craig Ferguson in 2012 as Beth the CBS executive.

Personal life
DeLorenzo is of Italian descent.  

DeLorenzo graduated from Chicago's DePaul University in 2005 with a degree in Media Communications.

Filmography

Film

Television

Video games

References

External links
 

1982 births
Actresses from Ohio
American stage actresses
American television actresses
American people of Italian descent
People of Sicilian descent
DePaul University alumni
Living people
21st-century American women